Seán Anthony Dowling (born 10 June 1978) is an Irish retired hurler who played for Kilkenny Championship club O'Loughlin Gaels. He played for the Kilkenny senior hurling team for five seasons, during which time he usually lined out as a right wing-back or at midfield.

Dowling began his hurling career at club level with O'Loughlin Gaels. He broke onto the club's top adult team as a 16-year-old in 1994 and enjoyed his first success the following year when the club won the 1995 Kilkenny Junior Championship. He won a Kilkenny Intermediate Championship title in 1996 and promotion to the top flight of Kilkenny hurling. Dowling went on to make numerous championship appearances at senior level and was at left wing-back on O'Loughlin Gaels' Leinster Club Championship-winning team in 2003. His club career ended as a result of a hip injury in 2010, by which time he had also won two Kilkenny Senior Championship titles.

At inter-county level, Dowling was part of the Kilkenny minor team that won back-to-back Leinster Minor Championships in 1995 and 1996 before winning the All-Ireland Under-21 Championship in 1999. He joined the Kilkenny senior team in 2001. From his debut, Dowling lined out as a half-back or a midfielder and made a combined total of 25 National League and Championship appearances in a career that ended with his last game in 2005. During that time he was part of two All-Ireland Championship-winning teams – in 2002 and 2003. Dowling also secured three successive Leinster Championship medals and three National Hurling League medals. He was dropped from the panel in June 2005.

Career statistics

Honours

O'Loughlin Gaels
Leinster Senior Club Hurling Championship (1): 2003
Kilkenny Senior Hurling Championship (2): 2001, 2002
Kilkenny Intermediate Hurling Championship (1): 1996
Kilkenny Junior Hurling Championship (1): 1995

Kilkenny
All-Ireland Senior Hurling Championship (2): 2002, 2003
Leinster Senior Hurling Championship (3): 2001, 2002, 2003
National Hurling League (3): 2002, 2003, 2005
All-Ireland Under-21 Hurling Championship (1): 1999
Leinster Under-21 Hurling Championship (2): 1998, 1999
Leinster Minor Hurling Championship (2): 1995, 1996

References

1978 births
Living people
O'Loughlin Gaels hurlers
Kilkenny inter-county hurlers
All-Ireland Senior Hurling Championship winners